La Guardia is a municipality located in the province of Toledo, Castile-La Mancha, Spain. There is documented presence since Bronze Age, Romans, Jews and documents since 12th century.

Population
2.329 inhabitants (as Spanish Statistical National Institute) 2006.
1166 men and 1163 women.

Geography
Altitude: 693 meters.
Latitude: 39° 46′ 59″ N
Longitude: 003° 28′ 59″ O

See also
Santo Niño de La Guardia

References

External links

 Town Council Official Web Page. 
 Multimedia web of La Guardia, graphical file of the village (with hundreds of pictures and videos)
 History of La Guardia in Guardiapedia.
 History of the Holly Child of La Guardia in Guardiapedia.
  Dictionary of La Guardia in Guardiapedia.
 History of the Holly Child of La Guardia in Guardiapedia.

Municipalities in the Province of Toledo